Élisabeth Beton-Delègue (born January 2, 1955, Bron) is a French diplomat who has been their ambassador to the Holy See since her appointment on April 10, 2019.  She has also served as Ambassador to Chile (2005-2008), Director of the Americas and the Caribbean at the Ministry of Europe and Foreign Affairs (2008-2012), and Ambassador to Mexico (2012-2014), Deputy Inspector General of Foreign Affairs (2014-2015), and Ambassador to Haiti (2015-2018).

Beton Delègue is the first female ambassador to the Holy See from France.

References

External links
Biographie de S.E.Mme Elisabeth Beton Delègue

French women ambassadors
Ambassadors of France to the Holy See
Ambassadors of France to Mexico
Ambassadors of France to Haiti
Ambassadors of France to Chile
1955 births
Living people
People from Bron
Diplomats from Lyon